Manturovsky District is an administrative and municipal district (raion), one of the twenty-eight in Kursk Oblast, Russia. It is located in the southeast of the oblast. Its administrative center is the rural locality (a selo) of Manturovo. Population:  16,758 (2002 Census);  The population of Manturovo accounts for 19.3% of the district's total population.

Geography
Manturovsky District is located in the southeast region of Kursk Oblast, on the border with Belgorod Oblast.  The terrain is hilly plain in the Central Russian Upland.   The main rivers in the district are the Seym River - which from the district flows west to the Dnieper River basin - and the Oskol River which flows south to the Don River, Russia basin).   The district is 60 km southeast of the city of Kursk, 110 km west of the city of Voronezh, and 480 km south of Moscow.  The area measures 25 km (north-south), and 45 km (west-east).   The administrative center is the town of Manturovo.

The district is bordered on the north by Timsky District, on the east by Gorshechensky District, on the south by Gubkinsky District of Belgorod Oblast, and on the west by Solntsevsky District.

References

Notes

Sources

External links
Manturovsky District on Google Maps
Manturovsky District on OpenStreetMap

Districts of Kursk Oblast